François Papineau (born 24 December 1966) is a Canadian actor who worked in stage and the Cinema of Quebec for over 25 years.

Papineau graduated from the National Theatre School of Canada in 1990.  He was nominated for the Genie Award for Best Actor for Route 132 (2010).

In 2015, he joined the cast of director Benoît Pilon's film Iqaluit, alongside Marie-Josée Croze and Natar Ungalaaq. Iqaluit was released in 2016, the same year as his Bad Seeds, and Wild Run: The Legend (Chasse-Galerie: La Légende), where Papineau played Jack Murphy, the Devil in the Chasse-galerie mythology. Papineau was tasked to play the villain as suave with a slight English accent.

He is married to actress Bénédicte Décary, with whom he costarred in the 2021 television series Entre deux draps.

Selected filmography
The Confessional (Le Confessionnal) - 1995
Post Mortem - 1999
Sable Island (L'Île de Sable) - 1999
Tar Angel (L'Ange de goudron) - 2001
The Collector (Le Collectionneur) - 2002
The Genius of Crime (Le Génie du crime) - 2006
Daddy Goes Ptarmigan Hunting (Papa à la chasse aux lagopèdes) - 2008
Mourning for Anna (Trois temps après la mort d'Anna) - 2010
Route 132 - 2010
A Life Begins (Une vie qui commence) - 2010
The Child Prodigy (L'Enfant prodige) - 2010
Wetlands (Marécages) - 2011
The Meteor (Le Météore) - 2013
Iqaluit - 2016
Wild Run: The Legend (Chasse-Galerie: La Légende) - 2016
9 (9, le film) - 2016
Bad Seeds (Les Mauvaises herbes) - 2016
The Fireflies Are Gone (La disparition des lucioles) - 2018
14 Days, 12 Nights (14 jours 12 nuits) - 2019
The Vinland Club (Le Club Vinland) - 2020
Entre deux draps - 2021
La Contemplation du mystère - 2021

References

External link

1966 births
Canadian male film actors
French Quebecers
Living people
Male actors from Montreal
National Theatre School of Canada alumni